The 1956–57 Idaho Vandals men's basketball team represented the University of Idaho during the 1956–57 NCAA University Division basketball season. Members of the Pacific Coast Conference, the Vandals were led by third-year head coach Harlan Hodges and played their home games on campus at Memorial Gymnasium in Moscow, Idaho.

Idaho played two home games in southern Idaho on consecutive nights in late December, a split against Colorado A&M in Idaho Falls and Twin Falls.

An injured ankle in late December kept guard Gary Simmons sidelined for more than a month.

References

External links
Sports Reference – Idaho Vandals: 1956–57 basketball season
Gem of the Mountains: 1957 University of Idaho yearbook – 1956–57 basketball season
Idaho Argonaut – student newspaper – 1957 editions

Idaho Vandals men's basketball seasons
Idaho
Idaho
Idaho